Arthur Romano (born 17 August 1997) is a French professional rugby league footballer who plays as a er or  for the Catalans Dragons in the Super League and France at international level. 

He has previously played for Saint-Esteve in the Elite One Championship. Romano has spent time on loan from Catalans at Toulouse Olympique in the Betfred Championship.

Background
Romano was born in Carpentras, Provence-Alpes-Côte d'Azur, France.

Career
In 2017 he made his Catalans debut in the Challenge Cup against Hull FC. He made his Super League appearance on May 29, 2017, also against Hull FC.

International career
He was selected in France 9s squad for the 2019 Rugby League World Cup 9s.

References

External links
Catalans Dragons profile
SL profile
Toulouse Olympique profile
France profile
French profile

1997 births
Living people
People from Carpentras
Rugby league centres
French rugby league players
AS Saint Estève players
Catalans Dragons players
Toulouse Olympique players
France national rugby league team players